Leptospermum neglectum is a shrub or small tree that is endemic to Queensland. It has elliptical leaves that are silky-hairy at first, white flowers on short shoots in leaf axils and fruit with the remnants of the sepals attached but that fall from the plant shortly after the seeds are released.

Description
Older stems have thin, fibrous bark, the younger stems often silky-hairy at first. There are a few reddish brown bracts and larger bracteoles at the base of the flower bud but all are shed before the flower opens. Flowering mainly occurs in October and the fruit is a capsule usually  in diameter with the remnants of the sepals attached, but which falls from the fruit shortly after the seeds are released.

Taxonomy and naming
Leptospermum neglectum was first formally described in 1989 by Joy Thompson in the journal Telopea, based on plant material collected in 1982 by Cyril Tenison White near Paluma. White considered it to be a variety (var. subsessile) of L. attenuatum, now known as Leptospermum trinervium (Sm.) Joy Thomps. The specific epithet (neglectum) refers to "the lost opportunities associated with it".

Distribution and habitat
This tea-tree grows in rocky places and on the coast and nearby ranges between Herberton and the Bundaberg district in Queensland.

Conservation status
This species is classified as of "least concern" under the Queensland Government Nature Conservation Act 1992.

References

neglectum
Myrtales of Australia
Flora of Queensland
Plants described in 1989
Taxa named by Joy Thompson